Gillian Keith (born 3 April 1972 in Toronto) is a Canadian/British operatic soprano, originally from Toronto, Canada, and living in London, UK.

Keith was educated at the Royal Academy of Music in London, Schulich School of Music of McGill University, Montreal, and at the Royal Conservatory of Music in Toronto.

Opera

Keith's roles include:
Zerbinetta in Strauss's Ariadne auf Naxos at the Royal Opera House, Welsh National Opera and Opera de Oviedo
Tytania in Britten's A Midsummer Night's Dream at the Royal Opera House and English National Opera
 Lubanara in The Philosopher's Stone (Der Stein der Weisen) by Mozart, Henneberg, Schack, Gerl and Schikaneder, Bampton Classical Opera
Poppea in Monteverdi's L'incoronazione di Poppea in Theater Basel and Boston Early Music Festival
Jeptha in Handel's Jeptha, Buxton Festival
Philine in Ambroise Thomas's Mignon, Buxton Festival
Sylvie in Gounod's La colombe, Buxton Festival
Iole in Handel's Hercules, Buxton Festival
Silvia in Mozart's Ascanio in Alba, Buxton Festival
Gloria in HK Gruber's Gloria: A Pigtale for Mahogany Opera Group/Bregenz Festival
Tiny in Britten's Paul Bunyan, Bregenz Festival
Nannetta in Verdi's Falstaff at English National Opera
Woodbird in Wagner's Siegfried, Scottish Opera
Amor in Gluck's Orfeo ed Euridice, Scottish Opera
Papagena in Mozart's The Magic Flute, Scottish Opera and Opera Atelier
Soprano in Purcell's King Arthur at English National Opera and in San Francisco
Soprano in Bach's St John Passion at English National Opera
Dew Fairy in Engelbert Humperdinck's Hansel and Gretel at the BBC Proms

Recordings

Bach Cantatas for Soprano Solo Volume I – Gillian Keith (soprano) with Armonico Consort. Label: Signum
Handel German Arias – Gillian Keith (soprano) with Florilegium. Label: Channel Classics
Gillian Keith Bei Strauss – Gillian Keith (soprano); Simon Lepper (piano). Label: Champs Hill Records
Handel: Gloria – Gillian Keith (soprano), John Eliot Gardiner (conductor) English Baroque Soloists. Label: Philips
Schubert Among Friends – Gillian Keith (soprano), Aldeburgh Connection, Stephen Ralls and Bruce Ubukata, piano, with Michael Schade, tenor and Colin Ainsworth, tenor
Bach Cantatas Vol. 23: Arnstadt/Echternach – Gillian Keith (soprano); Daniel Taylor (countertenor); Charles Daniels (tenor); Stephen Varcoe (Bass); Monteverdi Choir/English Baroque Soloists; John Eliot Gardiner (conductor). Label: Soli Deo Gloria
Debussy – Early Songs – Gillian Keith (soprano); Simon Lepper (piano). Label:  Deux-Elles Ltd.
Debussy – Songs For His Muse – Gillian Keith (soprano); Simon Lepper (piano).  Label:  Deux-Elles Ltd.
Luigi Dallapiccola: Orchestral Works Vol. 2 (in Partita and Quattro Liriche di Antonio Machado) – Gillian Keith (soprano); Paul Watkins (cello); BBC Philharmonic; Gianandrea Noseda (conductor). Label: Chandos Records
Ariadne On Naxos Richard Strauss – Gillian Keith (soprano), Sir Richard Armstrong (conductor) Scottish Chamber Orchestra, with Christine Brewer, Alice Coote, Robert Dean-Smith, Alan Opie. Label: Chandos

Awards

1998 Royal Over-Seas League Vocal Competition First Prize Winner
2000 Kathleen Ferrier Award
2003 Associate of the Royal Academy of Music (London, UK)

Sources
Crew, Robert, " Reunion for Gillian Keith; Soprano is back in town for Calisto Cavalli opera first performed in 1651 ", Toronto Star, 15 April 2004, p. G4
Kathleen Ferrier Awards Winners  (official website)
Philharmonia Orchestra, Gillian Keith

1972 births
Living people
Musicians from Toronto
21st-century Canadian women opera singers
Canadian operatic sopranos
McGill University School of Music alumni